The 1980 St Albans City and District Council election took place on 1 May 1980 to elect members of St Albans City and District Council in England. This was on the same day as other local elections.

Summary

Ward results

Ashley

Batchwood

Clarence

Colney Heath

There is an error for this election result in the source material where the result from London Colney is duplicated in the place of Colney Heath's result. The outcome of the election was a Liberal hold.

Cunningham

Harpenden East

Harpenden North

Harpenden South

Harpenden West

London Colney

Marshallwick North

Marshallwick South

Park Street

Redbourn

Sopwell

St. Peters

St. Stephens

Verulam

Wheathampstead

References

St Albans
St Albans City and District Council elections
1980s in Hertfordshire